Estefania Sibilia Pilz (born 7 August 1985) is an Argentine professional racing cyclist, who last rode for UCI Women's Continental Team .

Major results

2009
 National Road Championships
3rd Time trial
7th Road race
2010
 7th Time trial, National Road Championships
2011
 National Road Championships
1st  Road race
8th Time trial
2013
 5th Road race, National Road Championships
2014
 4th Road race, National Road Championships
2015
 1st Capitán Sarmiento
2016
 National Road Championships
1st  Time trial
10th Road race
 3rd Puivelde
2017
 2nd Oostduinkerke
 3rd Zwevezele
 6th Haaltert (Ladies Cycling Trophy Oost-Vlaanderen)
 6th Circuito Astronomia Paseo del Bosque
 8th Steenhuize
 9th Zandhoven (Pulderbos)
 9th Heusden (Ladies Cycling Trophy Oost-Vlaanderen)
2018
 1st  Time trial, National Road Championships
 2nd Overall Vuelta Femenina a San Juan

See also
 List of 2015 UCI Women's Teams and riders

References

External links

1985 births
Living people
Argentine female cyclists
Place of birth missing (living people)
21st-century Argentine women